This is a list of commercial banks in Gabon

 Alios Finance
 Banque de l’Habitat du Gabon (BHG)
 Banque Gabonaise de Developpement (BGD)
 BGFI Bank
 Banque Internationale pour le Commerce et l’Industrie au Gabon (BICIG)
 Citibank
 Ecobank
 ETS Finatra
 La Financiere Africaine de Micro-Projects (FINAM)
 Financial Bank Gabon
 FINATRA
 SOGACA
 Union Gabonaise de Banque (UGB)
 Banque Gabonaise et Française Internationale
 Banque Internationale pour le Gabon
 Banque Nationale de Crédit Rural
 Banque Populaire du Gabon
 United Bank for Africa

External links
Website of Central Bank of Central African States (French)

See also
 List of banks in Africa
 Central Bank of Central African States
 List of companies based in Gabon

References

 
Banks
Gabon
Gabon